Anders Östling (born 8 January 1972) is a Swedish bandy player, currently playing for Tillberga IK.

Career

Club career
Östling is a youth product of Skutskär and has represented Sandviken, Edsbyn, Västerås, Dynamo Kazan, and Tillberga.

International career
Östling was part of Swedish World Champions teams of 2003, 2005, and 2009

Honours

Country
 Sweden
 Bandy World Championship: 2003, 2005, 2009

References

External links
 

1972 births
Living people
Place of birth missing (living people)
Swedish bandy players
Expatriate bandy players in Russia
Swedish expatriate sportspeople in Russia
Skutskärs IF players
Sandvikens AIK players
Edsbyns IF players
Västerås SK Bandy players
Dynamo Kazan players
Tillberga IK Bandy players
Sweden international bandy players
Bandy World Championship-winning players